The Kavanagh Building is a famed skyscraper in Retiro, Buenos Aires, Argentina. Designed in 1934 by architects Gregorio Sánchez, Ernesto Lagos and Luis María de la Torre, it is considered a pinnacle of modernist architecture. At the time of its inauguration in 1936, the Kavanagh was the tallest building in Latin America surpassing the Palacio Salvo built in Montevideo in 1928, as well as the tallest building in the world with a reinforced concrete structure.

It is considered one of the quintessential buildings of Buenos Aires. A 2013 Clarín survey of 600 people who are not architects or builders found that the Kavanagh is the most liked building among porteños. The Kavanagh Building was declared a Historic Civil Engineering Landmark by the American Society of Civil Engineers in 1994 and a National Historic Monument of Argentina in 1999.

Location
The Kavanagh Building is located at 1065 Florida Street in the barrio of Retiro, overlooking Plaza San Martín.

History

It was designed in 1934, by local architects Gregorio Sánchez, Ernesto Lagos and Luis María de la Torre, built by the constructor and engineer Rodolfo Cervini, and inaugurated in 1936. Standing at a height of 120 meters, the building is characterised by the austerity of its lines, the lack of external ornamentation, and its large prismatic volumes. It was declared a Historic Civil Engineering Landmark by the American Society of Civil Engineers in 1994 and a National Historic Monument by the Argentine government in 1999. In the year of its completion the building obtained the Municipal Award for Collective Houses and Facades and three years later its facade received a similar award from the American Institute of Architects.

Its construction took only 14 months and was commissioned in 1934 by Corina Kavanagh, a millionaire of Irish descent who sold two ranches at the age of 39 to erect her own skyscraper. The building has a towering form, with symmetrical setbacks and gradual surface reductions. It was created from the outside in, adapting outstandingly comfortable facilities to the space available. The structure was carefully designed to be as slender as possible, in order to avoid unnecessary weight, and influenced by the city planning regulations. The design combines Modernism and Art Deco with a Rationalist approach and is considered the apex of early Modernism in Argentina.

The concrete structure was awarded to the la Empresa Argentina de Cemento Armado, E.A.C.A., integrated at that time by engineers Garbarini, Meuer and Gorostiaga. The tender was made based on a preliminary project prepared by the well-known structural engineer Carlos Laucher. The final project of the structure was executed by the Technical Office of the aforementioned company in charge of Eng. Fernando Schwarz. This engineer faced with brilliant success the responsibility of the calculation and project of the highest concrete skeleton in the world, demonstrating great capacity, as well as technical courage, because at that time he was in the infancy of Soil Mechanics and limited tools were available to resist the action of the wind,  especially with the material to be used.

It was at the time the highest skyscraper in Latin America. As the apartments in the new building were aimed at the upper middle classes, no expense was spared in its construction in order to ensure a result of the highest quality. All 105 apartments contained the latest in technological advances, including central air conditioning, twelve Otis elevators, and state-of-the-art plumbing. Those on the upper floors have exquisite terrace gardens with views of the river, parks and the city.

Corina Kavanagh lived for many years on the 14th floor in the largest apartment, the only one that occupies an entire floor. There is a legend that says that the shape of the building was designed as a revenge. Corina, who was from a wealthy but not an aristocrat family, fell in love with the son of the Anchorena family, who were both wealthy and aristocratic. The Anchorenas, who lived in a palace on the other side of Plaza San Martín (today known as the San Martín Palace) and had built a church that they could see from their palace, disapproved of the engagement. In revenge, Corina made only one demand to the architects: that it would block the Anchorena family's view of their church.

Architecture
The Kavanagh Building is considered a leading example of International Style architecture, a current known locally as rationalism or modern movement. The building is sometimes classified as Art Deco due to the similarity of both styles. La Nacións Fabio Grementieri called it a "masterful synthesis of rationalism and Art Deco, of renewal and tradition, of Paris and New York." Rationalism was introduced in Buenos Aires by intellectual Victoria Ocampo with the modernist house she commissioned to architect Alejandro Bustillo, built in Barrio Parque in 1929 and characterized by "simple cubic shapes, white walls and neat proportions". Its contrast with the Belle Époque-style houses of the rest of the neighborhood, popular among the city's upper classes, earned the building negative reviews. Nevertheless, Ocampo's house proved to be very influential as the rationalist style gained popularity during the 1930s. It was used in hospitals, movie theaters and a triad of high-rise buildings: the Kavanagh, Comega and Safico buildings. These early skyscrapers are characterized by the ziggurat-like approach of their design, mandated as per a municipal regulation analogous to New York City's 1916 Zoning Resolution, which had been adopted to stop tall buildings from preventing light and air from reaching the streets below. The Kavanagh Building showcases the growing influence of American architecture in the region at the time, caused by the political confrontation in Europe and technological transformations.

See also
List of Art Deco architecture
List of firsts in architecture
List of tallest buildings in Argentina
List of tallest buildings in Buenos Aires

Notes

References

External links

Art Deco skyscrapers
Buildings and structures in Buenos Aires
Residential buildings completed in 1936
National Historic Monuments of Argentina
Historic Civil Engineering Landmarks
Residential skyscrapers in Argentina
Art Deco architecture in Argentina
International Style (architecture)